Cermak–McCormick Place is a "L" station on the CTA's Green Line. The station, designed by Chicago-based Ross Barney Architects and engineered by Primary Consultant T.Y. Lin International,  is located at Cermak Road and State Street in the Near South Side neighborhood of Chicago. The station includes three entrances – one on each side of Cermak Road and one at 23rd Street.  The  main station entrance is built on the north side of Cermak road.

The new station replaced the original Cermak station that opened on June 6, 1892, closed on September 9, 1977, and was demolished in 1978. The new, fully accessible infill station was engineered and constructed into and around the existing, historic elevated rapid transit structure while maintaining full transit service. The station's signature element is the structural steel tube that serves as a windbreak for passenger boarding areas.

On January 17, 2012, Chicago mayor Rahm Emanuel announced at a press conference that the Cermak station would be rebuilt in order to serve McCormick Place. The $50 million investment is also intended to boost the development of residential neighborhoods in the City's Near South Side and revitalize the adjacent historic Motor Row District. A groundbreaking ceremony for the new station was held on August 29, 2013. 
The new Cermak-McCormick Place Green Line station opened on February 8, 2015.

Bus Connections
CTA

21 Cermak
29 State

Notes and references

Notes

References

CTA Green Line stations
Railway stations in the United States opened in 1892
Railway stations closed in 1977
Railway stations in the United States opened in 2015
1892 establishments in Illinois
1977 disestablishments in Illinois
2015 establishments in Illinois
McCormick Place